Chợ Mới is a rural district (huyện) of An Giang province in the Mekong Delta region of Vietnam. Chợ Mới is the district with the largest population in An Giang province. As of 2003, the district had a population of 362,492. The district covers 355 km². The district's capital lies at Chợ Mới.

In addition to the district capital Chợ Mới, there is one other urban subdivision, Mỹ Luông Town. The rural communes are: Kiến An, Kiến Thành, Mỹ Hội Đông, Nhơn Mỹ, Long Giang, Long Điền A, Long Điền B, Tân Mỹ, Mỹ Hiệp, Bình Phước Xuân, Long Kiến, An Thạch Trung, Hội An, Hòa Bình and Hoà An. The district is heavily criss-crossed by waterways in the delta, causing the district to consist of small islands. Hòa Hảo, Cao Đài,  Protestantism and Roman Catholicism are the main religions.

References

Districts of An Giang province
An Giang province